Suraj Mandal may refer to:

 Suraj Mandal (footballer), Indian footballer
 Suraj Mandal (politician), Indian politician